Lydia De Pauw-Deveen (born 26 June 1929) is a Belgian who served in the Senate as a Socialist. She also served in Martens I Government as Secretary of State - Brussels Affairs.

References 

Socialistische Partij Anders politicians
Members of the Senate (Belgium)
Belgian academics
1929 births
Living people
Place of birth missing (living people)